Voron is a Hungarian language surname from the Hungarian word for eagle. Notable people with the name include:
 Anna Sas (2003), Belarusian footballer
 Bert Sas (1892–1948), Netherlands military attaché
 Brunori Sas (1977), Italian singer
 Éva Sas (1970), French politician
 Ferenc Sas (1915–1988), Hungarian football player
 Igor Sas, Australian film, television and stage actor
 József Sas (1939–2021), Hungarian actor, comedian and theatre manager
 Kazimir Sas (1982), Australian film and television actor
 Marco Sas (1971), retired Dutch footballer
 Norman Sas (1925–2012), American toy inventor, mechanical engineer and manufacturer

References 

Hungarian-language surnames
Surnames from nicknames